John Brogden may refer to:

 John Brogden (industrialist) (1798–1869), British railway industrialist
 John Brogden Jun. (industrialist) (1823–1855), British railway industrialist
 John Brogden (jeweller), British Victorian-era jeweller
 John Brogden (politician) (born 1969), Australian politician

See also
 John Brogden and Sons